The ETAP 26i is a Belgian sailboat that was designed by Mortain & Mavrikios as a cruiser and first built in 1994.

Production
The design was built by ETAP Yachting in Belgium between 1994 and 2006, but it is now out of production.

Design
The ETAP 26i is a recreational keelboat, built predominantly of glassfibre, with wood trim. It has a fractional sloop rig, a plumb stem, a reverse transom with steps, an internally mounted spade-type rudder controlled by a tiller and a fixed fin keel or optional dual tandem keels. It displaces  and carries  of iron ballast, with either keel.

The boat is fitted with a Swedish Volvo Penta 2010  diesel engine with a saildrive, for docking and manoeuvring. The fuel tank holds .

The design has sleeping accommodation for four people, with a double "V"-berth in the bow cabin and an aft cabin with a double berth on the port side. The galley is located on the port side just forward of the companionway ladder. The galley is "L"-shaped and is equipped with a two-burner stove, an ice box and a sink. A navigation station is opposite the galley, on the starboard side. The head is located opposite the galley, on the starboard side, aft of the navigation station.

For sailing downwind the design may be equipped with an asymmetrical spinnaker.

Operational history
The boat was at one time supported by a class club, the ETAP Owners Association.

See also
List of sailing boat types

References

External links
ETAP 26i photo gallery

Keelboats
1990s sailboat type designs
Sailing yachts
Trailer sailers
Sailboat type designs by Mortain & Mavrikios
Sailboat types built by ETAP Yachting